David Percy Aymeri Louhoungou (born 28 February 1989) is a footballer who currently plays as a midfielder for US Roye-Noyon. Born in France, he represents Congo at international level.

Career
Born in Paris, Louhoungou began his career in the youth by INF Clairefontaine and joined Stade Rennais in 2005. On 5 August 2009, Louhoungou signed for Scottish club Hamilton Academical. He left Hamilton on 12 December 2009 and signed on 1 February 2010 for Turkish side Kocaelispor. Louhoungou joined US Boulogne on 21 September 2010 and spent the 2011–12 season on loan at AS Cannes before joining AS Beauvais in 2012.

Louhoungou went on trial at Conference National side Gatehsead in July 2013. He played the first half of Gateshead's 2–1 pre-season friendly win over Partick Thistle on 6 July and the second half against Barrow four days later, but was released after two weeks at the club. He subsequently joined JSM Béjaïa in January 2014.

After being released by Béjaïa, Louhoungou spent the 2014–15 season with amateur club Rezé in the French seventh division. On 4 June 2015, it was announced that the midfielder had joined Championnat de France amateur side US Roye-Noyon ahead of the 2015–16 campaign.

International career
He is a member of the Congo national football team.

Louhoungou made a full international debut for Congo on 12 August 2009 in a friendly against Morocco.

Titles
 2008: Winner de la Coupe Gambardella
 2007: Champion de France Under 18

References

External links
 Stats & Profile
 
 

Living people
1989 births
Footballers from Paris
Association football midfielders
French footballers
INF Clairefontaine players
Stade Rennais F.C. players
Hamilton Academical F.C. players
Kocaelispor footballers
US Boulogne players
AS Cannes players
AS Beauvais Oise players
JSM Béjaïa players
US Roye-Noyon players
Scottish Premier League players
Republic of the Congo footballers
French sportspeople of Republic of the Congo descent
Expatriate footballers in Scotland
Republic of the Congo international footballers
Black French sportspeople